Abolfazl Fateh (born 1966) is an Iranian journalist, medical doctor, and political activist, known as the founder of the state-run Iranian Students News Agency (ISNA).

Education 
Abolfazl Fateh was born in November 1966. He graduated from the Tehran University of Medical Sciences in 1996, achieving the degree of Medical Doctor, and obtained his PhD from the University of Oxford with a thesis entitled "'he Power of News Production".

Career
Fateh was the director of Islamic Students Association at Tehran University from 1991 to 1996. On November 4, 1999, he founded the Iranian Students News Agency (ISNA) to report on news from Iranian universities that later covered a variety of national and international topics. While taking a reformist view of events, ISNA has remained politically independent. It has, however, maintained its loyalty to the former president and includes a section devoted to "Khatami's perspectives". Fateh was ISNA's managing director until his resignation on 10 October 2005.

Abolfazl Fateh was taken to the court on several occasions over the agency's reports. He was beaten by riot police while supporting his correspondents to report student demonstration in June 2003.

Abolfazl Fateh served as one of Mir-Hossein Mousavi's advisors during the 2009 Iranian presidential election. He was banned from leaving Iran because of his role in the campaign, though the ban was later lifted.

Abolfazl Fateh established a news agency model (ISNA) in Iran with the motto "one student, one correspondent" and "one idea, one news".

Politically, Fateh is aligned with Iranian reformists on the religious left wing, loyal to Ayatollah Khomeini's political framework. He has been politically-active as a moderate reformist on a platform of reforming the system based on the Iranian Constitution.

Fateh has worked as a researcher at the Center for Strategic Studies in the UK, and is based in Manchester, England.

See also
Iranian Students News Agency (ISNA)

References

Alumni of the University of Oxford
University of Tehran alumni
Iranian journalists
21st-century Iranian politicians
Mass media people from Tehran
Living people
Online journalists
1966 births
People from Shahrud, Iran